The 2004 Ivy League Baseball Championship Series took place at Red Rolfe Field at Biondi Park in Hanover, New Hampshire on May 8, 2004.  The series matched the regular season champions of each of the league's two divisions.  , the winner of the series, claimed their second consecutive, and fifth overall, title and the Ivy League's automatic berth in the 2004 NCAA Division I baseball tournament.  It was Princeton's ninth appearance in the Championship Series, all of which were consecutive.

Dartmouth made their third appearance in the Championship Series, also having lost to Princeton in 2000 and 2001.

Results

References

Ivy League Baseball Championship Series
Tournament
Ivy League Baseball Championship Series